= Second (curling) =

Position in curling

Curling positions
Skip
Third
Second
Lead

In curling, the second is the person who delivers the second pair of stones after the lead. On most teams, where the second does not act as skip or vice, the second will sweep for each of their teammates. Due to the free-guard-zone rule, which prevents guards from being removed from play by the leads, the second is usually a curler with a high degree of proficiency throwing takeouts, peels, and other power shots. Following the adoption of the five-rock rule in 2018, the role of the second has become more of a finesse role, as seconds often have to throw guards and other finesse shots.
